Robert Kemp (8 October 1878, Paris – 3 July 1959) was a French journalist and literary critic, writing for L'Aurore, La Liberté, Le Temps and Le Monde (successor to Temps). On 29 November 1956 he was elected to seat 5 of the Académie française.

1878 births
1959 deaths
Writers from Paris
French journalists
Members of the Académie Française
French literary critics
French male non-fiction writers